Tire-derived aggregate (TDA) is a building material made of recycled tires, which are shredded into pieces of varying sizes. It is commonly used in construction projects because it is sustainable and lightweight, along with being cheaper than many available materials.  Common applications for TDA including landfilling, landslide stabilization, and vibration mitigation. In 2007, an estimated 561.6 thousand tons (about 509 metric tons) of TDA were produced. This accounted for about 12 percent of the total recycled tire material used.

References 

Tire industry
Building materials